Nativity School is a private Catholic elementary school in Cincinnati, Ohio. It aims to provide students "a solid academic education with a global perspective in which the arts and technology are integrated into the curriculum  — all rooted in the Gospel of Jesus Christ".

Since 1980 Nativity has emphasized global education.  It was then that Nativity joined International School-to-School Experience (ISSE), an organization that partners elementary schools for the purpose of a student exchange.  In the years that followed, Nativity has exchanged delegations with schools in India, Australia, New Zealand, Malaysia, Argentina, Ecuador, Costa Rica, El Salvador, Honduras, Jamaica, Bermuda, and Mexico.  Beyond ISSE Nativity has worked with schools in France, Ukraine, China, Finland, Germany, Hungary, Poland, Netherlands, Russia, and Kenya. The World Language Program at Nativity now includes instruction in Spanish (K–8) and Latin (6–8) and online German and French (6–8).  There is an emphasis on geography with the expectation that graduates of Nativity will be well versed in political and physical geography.

References

Private schools in Cincinnati
Catholic schools in Ohio
Catholic elementary schools in Ohio